Karusasaurus, commonly known as Karusa lizards, is a genus of lizards in the family Cordylidae.

Its species were previously considered to be included in the genus Cordylus, but more recent studies have shown that they are distinct enough to have their own genus.

Description and distribution
Karusasaurus contains two species, which are widely distributed across the southern part of Africa, specifically, in the semi-arid areas of South Africa and Namibia. Like all girdled lizards, they are insectivores. They come in a great range of colors, including black, red, and turquoise.

Species
Karusasaurus jordani  – Jordan's girdled lizard, Namibian girdled lizard
Karusasaurus polyzonus  – Karoo girdled lizard, southern Karusa lizard

Nota bene: A binomial authority in parentheses indicates that the species was originally described in a genus other than Karusasaurus.

References

Further reading
Stanley, Edward L.; Bauer, Aaron M.; Jackman, Todd R.; Branch, William R., Mouton, P. Le Fras N. (2011). "Between a rock and a hard polytomy: Rapid radiation in the rupicolous girdled lizards (Squamata: Cordylidae)". Molecular Phylogenetics and Evolution 58: 53–70. (Karusasaurus, new genus, p. 66).

Karusasaurus
Lizard genera
Lizards of Africa
Taxa named by William Roy Branch